Rathkenny GFC is a Gaelic Athletic Association club based in the small village of Rathkenny, in County Meath, Ireland. The club takes part in Meath GAA competitions. The club have won 5 Meath Senior Football Championship titles. Rathkenny are currently competing at senior level, and have been since 2007. The club was founded in 1886, making it one of the oldest clubs in Meath. Rathkenny is a great club. Oliva gore who plays on the ladies meath team played with Rathkenny.

History
Rathkenny's first game was on 13 February 1887, against Grangegeeth. Rathkenny won 2 points to 0. The club's golden years were from the mid-1910s to 1923. During this period, Rathkenny won 2 Feis Cups and 5 Senior Football Championships. In 1923, Rathkenny won the Championship by playing just one game, against Martyr GAA. Just three teams entered that year and after defeating Martyr, Rathkenny were to play Navan Harps in the final in Kells. Navan Harps didn't arrive for the game and Rathkenny were awarded the title. In April 1925, Rathkenny applied to be reinstated as a junior team. The reinstatement was made on behalf of the old Rathkenny players. It would until winning the Intermediate Championship in 2006 for Rathkenny to become a Senior team again.

Senior Football Championship Record

Notable players
 Donal Keogan
 Brian Meade
 Mick White

Honours
Meath Senior Football Championship: 5
1917, 1918, 1919, 1922, 1923
Meath Intermediate Football Championship: 5
1934, 2006
Meath Junior Football Championship: 2
1916, 1984
Feis Cups: 2
1920, 1922

External links
Rathkenny G.F.C Website
 GAA Info

Gaelic games clubs in County Meath